Victoria Valeryevna Ilina (born March 28, 1999 in Saransk, Russia) is a Russian Group rhythmic gymnast. She is the 2014 Youth Olympic Group all-around champion and the 2013 European Junior Group all-around champion.

Junior 
Ilina started out competing as an individual gymnast. Her first major international tournament was competing in the junior division at the 2012 Moscow Grand Prix. In 2013, Ilina began competing as a Group gymnast, she was member of the Russian Group at the  2013 European Junior Championships with Russia taking the gold medal scoring a total of (33.916) ahead of Belarus (32.700) and Bulgaria (32.532) in the all-around competition. They won another gold medal in 5 hoops final.

In 2014, Ilina competed with the Russian Group at the 2014 Moscow Grand Prix taking gold in Group all-around, following their placement, the Russian Group earned a qualification to compete for the Youth Olympic Games. On August 26–27, Ilina was member of the Russian Group (with Daria Anenkova, Daria Dubova, Sofya Skomorokh, Natalia Safonova) that competed at the 2014 Youth Olympic Games in Nanjing, China where they won gold in Group All-around finals.

References

External links 
 
 
 2014 Youth Olympic Games profile at Nanjing2014.org 
 Rhythmic Gymnastics Results 

1999 births
Living people
Russian rhythmic gymnasts
Gymnasts at the 2014 Summer Youth Olympics
Youth Olympic gold medalists for Russia
People from Saransk
Sportspeople from Mordovia
21st-century Russian women